Throughout history, América de Cali has had a large number of coaches. Following the list of coaches since the beginning of professionalism:

List of managers

Managers by nationality

Titles by manager

References 

América de Cali managers
América de Cali
América de Cali